Cansu Nur Kaya (born 28 February 2000) is a Turkish women's football defender, who plays in the Turkish Super League for Fatih Vatan Spor with jersey number 20. She played for the Turkey girls' U-17 and women's U1-19 teams before she became a member of the Turkey women's national team.

Club career 
Cansu Nur Kaya obtained her license from Pendik Çamlık Spor on 30 April 2015. She debuted in the 2016-17 Third League.  She played four seasons in the Third League for Pendik Çamlık Spor netting 38 goals in 58 öatches. In the 2020-21First League season, she transferred to Fatih Vatan Spor. Her team became runner-up losing to Beşiktaş J.K. in the play-off final. She was honored the award of Most Valuable Player of the league.

Kaya transferred to Beşiktaş J.K. end June 2021, and played in one match of the 2021–22 UEFA Women's Champions League qualifying rounds. For the 2022-23 Sıper League season, she returned to her former club Fatih Vatan Spor.

International career 
In 2017, Kaya was admitted to the Turkey girld' U-17 team, and capped in two games of the 2017 UEFA Development Tournament.

The same year, she joined the Turkey women's U-19 team. She participated at all three matches of the 2018 UEFA Women's U-19 Championship qualification - Group 10 and all three games of the Elite round. She appeared also in all three matches of 2019 UEFA Women's U-19 Championship qualification - Group 2. and all three matches of the Elite round. She capped in total 20 times.

In 2020, she became a member of the Turkey women's national team.  She played her first official international match for the senior team at the UEFA Women's Euro 2022 qualifying Group A against Estonia on 27 November 2020.

Career statistics 
.

Honours

Club
 Turkish Women's First League
 Fatih Vatan Spor
 Runners-up (1): 2020–21

Individual
 ''Most Valuable Player': 2020–21 with Fatih Vatan Spor

References 

2000 births
Living people
People from Kartal
Footballers from Istanbul
Turkish women's footballers
Women's association football defenders
Turkey women's international footballers
Fatih Vatan Spor players
Beşiktaş J.K. women's football players
Turkish Women's Football Super League players